Téhiri is a village in southern Ivory Coast. It is in the sub-prefecture of Bayota, Gagnoa Department, Gôh Region, Gôh-Djiboua District.

Téhiri was a commune until March 2012, when it became one of 1126 communes nationwide that were abolished.

Notes

Former communes of Ivory Coast
Populated places in Gôh-Djiboua District
Populated places in Gôh